The Battle of Tarnab took place in 1448. 

In spring 1448, Ala al-Dawla Mirza was making preparations for the celebration of his son's circumcision ceremony. He had announced a general relief from taxes to all citizens of Herat when he heard the news that Ulugh Beg crossing the Amu Darya with 90,000 troops. He hastily made his way towards the Tarnab through the Sanjab Pass. The two forces met at Tarnab and after a brief engagement, Ulugh Beg decisively defeated Ala al-Dawla Mirza who fled towards Mashad and then towards Quchan in the protection of his brother Abul-Qasim Babur Mirza. Ulugh Beg followed up his victory by taking Herat and then Mashad. Gawhar Shad and many Tarkhans left Herat before Ulugh Beg's arrival.

Bibliography

General sources 
Tarnab 1448
Herat
Tarnab 1448
1448 in Asia
Medieval Afghanistan
Tarnab 1448
Other sources:

W. Weberhard (1959), Journal of Oriental Studies, University of Hong Kong